Hochburg-Ach is a municipality in the district of Braunau am Inn in the Austrian state of Upper Austria.

Geography
Hochburg-Ach lies in the Innviertel on the Germany border, directly opposite the Bavarian town of Burghausen. It lies east of the Salzach. About 42 percent of the municipality is forest and 52 percent farmland.

Notable people
 Franz Xaver Gruber (1787–1863), primary school teacher, church organist and composer was born here.

References

Cities and towns in Braunau am Inn District